Protea laetans, the Blyde River protea or Blyde sugarbush, is a localized plant of the family Proteaceae. It was recognised as a species in 1970, and is endemic to the Blyde River Canyon of the Mpumalanga escarpment, South Africa. The slender plants are up to 5m tall and flower from mid to late summer. The bracts of their closed flower heads are shiny and silvery in appearance. They are most easily viewed near the F.H. Odendaal camp of the Blyde River Canyon Nature Reserve. Laetans means joyous, i.e. Blyde.

Gallery

References

External links

laetans
Endemic flora of South Africa
Vulnerable flora of Africa
Taxonomy articles created by Polbot